Currently, two species are placed in the recently established genus Nadzikambia (derived from the species' name in Chichewa). They are plesiomorphic, small chameleons from the Ruo Gorge forest on Mount Mulanje in Malawi and Mount Mabu in Mozambique.

Initially placed into Chamaeleo, it was for some time moved to the South African dwarf chameleons (Bradypodion) by some (Klaver & Böhme, 1986). This was criticized because plesiomorphies cannot be used to define clades, and eventually turned out to be in error.

Species

References

  (1986): Phylogeny and classification of the Chamaeleonidae (Sauria) with special reference to hemipenis morphology. Bonner Zoologische Monographien 22: 1–64.
  (2007): Corrections to species names recently placed in Kinyongia and Nadzikambia (Reptilia: Chamaeleonidae). Zootaxa 1426: 68.

 
Lizard genera
Taxa named by Colin R. Tilbury
Taxa named by Krystal A. Tolley
Taxa named by William Roy Branch